Exocoetoidei is a suborder of the order Beloniformes, which is sometimes known as the Belonoidei. It contains two superfamilies and five families.

Classification
Exocoetoidei is classified as follows:

 Suborder Exocoetoidei
 Superfamily Scomberesocoidea Bleeker, 1859
 Family Belonidae Bonaparte, 1835 (Needlefishes)
 Family Scomberesocidae Bleeker 1859 (Sauries)
 Superfamily Exocoetoidea
 Family Exocoetidae Risso, 1827 (Flying fishes)
 Family Hemiramphidae Gill, 1859 (Halfbeaks)
 Family Zenarchopteridae Fowler, 1934 (Freshwater halfbeaks)

References

Beloniformes